Ismail Isa Mustafa (born 26 June 1989) is a Bulgarian professional footballer who plays as a forward for Cherno More Varna.

Career
Born in Targovishte, Isa started playing football at PFC Svetkavitsa's youth teams.

Levski Sofia

Ismail Isa made his unofficial debut for Levski in a friendly match against Dynamo Kyiv on 20 January 2008. He played for 33 minutes. The result was a 1–2 loss for Levski. On 20 February, he scored his first goals in a friendly against Vidima-Rakovski Sevlievo. He scored two goals in the 75th and 85th minute. The result of the match was a 3–0 win for Levski. He made his official debut in a 1–0 defeat away to Lokomotiv Plovdiv.

During the 2008–09 season, he was loaned to OFC Sliven 2000. Anyway, after the end of the season, he returned to Levski.

Isa re-debuted for Levski on 15 July 2009 in the 2nd Qualifying round of UEFA Champions League, where Levski defeated the team of UE Sant Julià. The result of the match was 4–0 with a home win for Levski. On 21 July, he was sent off at the stroke of half time for a second bookable offense in the return leg against the Andorran side, but despite playing a man down his team won 5–0. His return was in a match against Dundalk – a second qualifying round of Europa League. Levski won the first match and the result was 6:0. Isa scored two of the goals. He further added to his tally in the 5–2 home win against the Swedish Kalmar FF, where he scored another two goals.

Isa scored his first goal for Levski in the Bulgarian A Professional Football Group on 23 August 2010 against Kaliakra Kavarna.

Lokomotiv Mezdra (loan)
On 2 August 2009, Ismail Isa was loaned for half a season in Lokomotiv Mezdra. After matches, in which he scored 7 goals in 12 matches, Isa returned to Levski. Shortly afterwards on 11 January 2010, though, he was loaned out to Lokomotiv Mezdra again.
On 21 March 2010, he scored the only goal for his side to give the team from Mezdra a 1:0 lead against the other Bulgarian top team CSKA Sofia. This goal got him in the news since just a few minutes after it the CSKA supporters flooded the field and stopped the match, earning their team a 3–0 disciplinary loss (4:0 aggregate loss). After scoring 11 goals in 25 caps Isa was brought back to Levski on 24 May.

Karabükspor
In June 2011, Isa joined Turkish Super League club Karabükspor. Media reports estimated the transfer fee to be around €200,000. On 22 October 2011, Isa made his official debut for his new team, playing the first 85 minutes and earning himself a yellow card in the 2:0 home win over Istanbul B.B. in a Turkish Süper Lig match.

Litex
Isa was signed by Litex Lovech for the 2012/2013 season and netted 7 goals in 11 appearances during the first half of the season. He finished the 2012/2013 A PFG season as the fifth highest goal scorer in the league, having managed 11 goals.

Sheriff Tiraspol
In June 2013, Isa signed a contract with Moldovan club Sheriff Tiraspol. He marked his debut by scoring a goal in the 2:0 win over FC Tiraspol in a Moldovan Super Cup match that was held on 29 June.

Beroe
Isa returned to Bulgaria, joining Beroe Stara Zagora in September 2015.

Vereya
On 19 October 2017, Isa signed with First League side Vereya.

International career
Isa was a part of the Bulgaria national under-19 football team. During his time with the team he played in the 2008 UEFA European Under-19 Football Championship in the Czech Republic. On 29 April 2008, he scored a goal in qualifying match against Norway. 

On 7 February 2015, Isa made his first appearance for Bulgaria, in the 0–0 draw against Romania in a non-official friendly match, playing over the course of the first 70 minutes. He was recalled to the national team in May 2019 by new manager Krasimir Balakov and played as a starter in the 1–2 away loss against the Czech Republic in a Euro 2020 qualifier on 7 June 2019, opening the scoring with his first international goal.

International goals
Scores and results list Bulgaria's goal tally first.

Personal life
His father is of Turkish descent and his mother is of Bulgarian descent.

Career statistics

Honours
Levski Sofia
 Bulgarian A Football Group (1) - 2008-09
 Bulgarian Supercup (1) - 2009

FC Sheriff Tiraspol
 Moldovan Super Cup (1) - 2013
Moldovan National Division: 2013–14

References

External links
 
 
 Profile at LevskiSofia.info

1989 births
Living people
People from Targovishte
Bulgarian people of Turkish descent
Association football forwards
Bulgarian footballers
Bulgaria youth international footballers
Bulgaria under-21 international footballers
Bulgaria international footballers
Bulgarian expatriate footballers
PFC Svetkavitsa players
FC Haskovo players
PFC Levski Sofia players
OFC Sliven 2000 players
PFC Lokomotiv Mezdra players
Kardemir Karabükspor footballers
Elazığspor footballers
PFC Litex Lovech players
FC Sheriff Tiraspol players
PFC Beroe Stara Zagora players
FC Dacia Chișinău players
FC Vereya players
FC Dunav Ruse players
PFC Cherno More Varna players
First Professional Football League (Bulgaria) players
Süper Lig players
TFF First League players
Moldovan Super Liga players
Bulgarian expatriate sportspeople in Turkey
Bulgarian expatriate sportspeople in Moldova
Expatriate footballers in Turkey
Expatriate footballers in Moldova